Mecar is a Belgian weapon and ammunition manufacturing company headquartered in Petit-Roeulx-lez-Nivelles, Hainaut Province. Mecar is responsible for creating weapons ranging from grenades to lightweight anti-tank cannons. The company was established in 1938 and now produces arms for NATO, Belgium, and other various countries. The company is now a wholly owned subsidiary of NEXTER Systems S.A., a French Defense Systems company following the acquisition in May 2014.

References

 
Manufacturing companies established in 1938
Manufacturing companies of Belgium
Weapons manufacturing companies
Belgian companies established in 1938